was a Japanese painter and artist known for his depiction of the female form. Born in Kagoshima Prefecture Japan, he graduated from middle school at Aoyama Gakuin University and displayed his first one-man show at Hibiya Art Museum at the age of 18. He later participated in the Futurist movement while studying in France. In 1928, he returned to Japan and was awarded the 1st Showa Western Art Promotion Award.

In 1957, Togo received the Japan Art Academy Award, and in 1961 became a member of the Japan Art Academy. In 1969, was declared an Officier d'ordre des Arts et des Lettres by the French government and in 1976 was decorated with the Order of the Rising Sun, Second Class, with Rays. Togo died in 1978 in Kumamoto at the age of 80. Later that year, he was posthumously named a Person of Cultural Merit of the fourth court rank by the Japanese government.

His works can be seen at the Seiji Togo Memorial SOMPO Japan Museum of art in Tokyo, where more than 200 of his most prominent works are kept.

References
 Museum's page on Togo

External links 

1897 births
1978 deaths
Aoyama Gakuin University alumni
People from Kagoshima
Japanese racehorse owners and breeders
Officiers of the Ordre des Arts et des Lettres
20th-century Japanese painters